Lo Cheung-shiu (羅長肇, 1867–1934) was a prominent Hong Kong businessman and the founder of the Lo family, an influential family in Hong Kong. He is also George She's brother-in-law.

Biography
Lo Cheung-shiu  is the first generation of Hong Kong Eurasian. His father was Thomas Rothwell, an English businessman, and his mother was a Chinese woman.  In his early years, his mother had friends with He Dong and Ho Fook's mother is Ms.Shi, Huang Jinfu's mother is Ms.Wu, Xian Defen's mother is Ms.Huang, and Mai Xiuying's mother is Ms.Wu. The older sister Luo Ruicai (Luo Xucai) married Ho Fook, so the relationship became friends with Ho Tung, and the children had four in-law relationships with the Robert Ho Tung family. 

Lo was a compradore of Jardine, Matheson & Co., formerly one of the leading British mercantile firms in the Far East. He retired in 1920. During his lifetime, Lo held a number of directorships in Hong Kong companies, including China Light and Power Company and the Hong Kong Construction Company.

Lo was a wealthy businessman in the early days of Hong Kong's port opening. He and Ho Tung were close friends. Ho Tung introduced Ren Yihe to the comprador in early years. In 1914, he founded Dayou Bank with Liu Zhubo, He Dong, He Fu, He Gantang and Chen Qiming. This is the second bank set up by Chinese in Hong Kong after the Guangdong Bank. 

He served on the boards of various local charities. In 1915, he became a director of the Tung Wah Hospital, then the leading Chinese charity in the colony, and later became emeritus advisor to the hospital and permanent board member of Po Leung Kuk. He also served as vice-chairman of the Chinese General Chamber of Commerce and was on its executive committee for many years.

He was made a Justice of the Peace and a member of the District Watch Committee. In 1930, he was awarded a Certificate of Honour on the occasion of King George V's birthday.

On 20 June 1934, after a lengthy illness, he died at 12:30 a.m. at his residence on Conduit Road, Mid-Levels, aged 67. He left an estate worth a reported 543,600 dollars. His funeral took place on 3 July and was attended by many local leaders. The flag of Jardine, Matheson & Co. was hoisted at half mast.

Family
Lo's wife, Shi Xiangqing, younger sister of George She, a partner of the Qing mission in North Korea. Lo had four sons, Man-kam, Man-wai, Man-ho, and Man-hin (Horace), and five daughters. Four of his sons went into law and founded Lo and Lo, a well known solicitors firm that remains active today. Man-kam and Man-wai entered politics and became members of the Executive Council and Legislative Council of Hong Kong. 

Lo Cheung-shiu's grandson, Lo Tak-shing, also served on the Executive and Legislative Councils and was appointed to the Chinese People's Political Consultative Conference and Hong Kong Basic Law Drafting Committee. He ran as a candidate in elections for the first Hong Kong Chief Executive in 1997.

See also
 Four big families of Hong Kong

References

1867 births
1934 deaths
Hong Kong businesspeople
Hong Kong philanthropists
Jardine Matheson Group
Hong Kong people of English descent